Air Chief Marshal (Ret) Ida Bagus Putu Dunia (born 20 February 1957) is the former Chief of Staff of the Indonesian Air Force. He briefly served as the head of the Indonesian Military Command and 

Staff College in 2012 before being appointed as Chief of Staff of the Air Force on 17 December 2012.

References

1957 births
Balinese people
Indonesian Hindus
Living people
Indonesian Air Force air marshals
Chiefs of Staff of the Indonesian Air Force